Kanižarica is a settlement southwest of the town of Črnomelj in the White Carniola area of southeastern Slovenia. The area is part of the traditional region of Lower Carniola and is now included in the Southeast Slovenia Statistical Region.

History
During the Second World War, on 19 July 1942, the Partisan White Carniola Detachment took 61 Roma from Kanižarica. They were marched to Mavrlen, which had recently been emptied of its Gottschee German residents, held prisoner there for two days, and then murdered and buried in the Zagradec Mass Grave southeast of the abandoned settlement of Gradec, now part of the settlement of Rožič Vrh.

Coal mine
A coal mine in the settlement that began in 1857 and was closed 1995 is partly preserved. The main mine shaft has been filled in, but the headframe and administrative buildings remain and some of the original mining equipment is displayed in a reconstructed shaft.

References

External links
Kanižarica on Geopedia

Populated places in the Municipality of Črnomelj
Antiziganism in Europe
Romani history